The Brown, later Pigott-Brown Baronetcy, of Broome Hall in Capel in the County of Surrey, is a title in the Baronetage of the United Kingdom. It was created on 5 January 1903 for Alexander Hargreaves Brown, Liberal Member of Parliament for Wenlock from 1868 to 1885 and Liberal Unionist Member of Parliament for Wellington from 1885 to 1906. He was the third son of Alexander Brown, eldest son of Sir William Brown, 1st Baronet (see Brown baronets, of Astrop). Brown's eldest son Captain Gordon Hargreaves Brown (died 1914) was killed in action in the First World War. In 1910 he had married Edith Ivy, eldest daughter and co-heir of Admiral William Harvey Pigott. She assumed in 1925 the additional surname of Pigott for herself and her issue. Their son, the second Baronet, was killed in action in the Second World War. On the death without issue in 2020 of the latter's only son, the third Baronet, who succeeded in 1942, the baronetcy became extinct.

Brown, later Pigott-Brown baronets, of Broome Hall (1903)
Sir Alexander Hargreaves Brown, 1st Baronet (1844–1922)
Sir John Hargreaves Pigott-Brown, 2nd Baronet (1913–1942)
Sir William Brian Pigott-Brown, 3rd Baronet (1941–2020) unmarried d.s.p.

Arms

See also
Brown baronets

References

Kidd, Charles, Williamson, David (editors). Debrett's Peerage and Baronetage (1990 edition). New York: St Martin's Press, 1990.

Pigott-Browne